The 2020 World Athletics Label Road Races are the thirteenth edition of the global series of road running competitions given Label status by World Athletics (formerly IAAF). The series included a range of road events which was affected due to the growing concern about the coronavirus pandemic including the World Marathon Majors events like the Tokyo marathon, the Boston Marathon and the London Marathon.

From the World Marathon Majors, Tokyo Marathon was cancelled for amateur runners and was held only as an elite event on the scheduled date on 1 March. The Boston Marathon, scheduled to be held on 20 April, was postponed to 14 September, while the London Marathon scheduled for 26 April was rescheduled to 4 October.

Races

References

External links 
Race calendar
Calendar 2020 World Athletics Label Road Races . WA. Retrieved 2020-04-05.

World Athletics Label Road Races
Road Race Label Events